The Jiufotang Formation (Chinese: 九佛堂组, pinyin: jiǔfótáng zǔ) is an Early Cretaceous geological formation in Chaoyang, Liaoning which has yielded fossils of feathered dinosaurs, primitive birds, pterosaurs, and other organisms (see Jehol Biota). It is a member of the Jehol group. The exact age of the Jiufotang has been debated for years, with estimates ranging from the Late Jurassic to the Early Cretaceous. New uranium-lead dates reveal the formation is deposited in the Aptian stage of the Early Cretaceous. Fossils of Microraptor and Jeholornis are from the Jiufotang.

Fossil content

Choristoderans

Fish

Mammaliamorphs 
Several mammaliamorph specimens have been found from the Jiufotang, but only a few have been formally described and named.

Ornithischians

Pterosaurs

Saurischians
A large titanosaur is present in the formation.

Enantiornithines

Euornithines

Non-ornithothoracean theropods

See also 
 Yixian Formation
 List of dinosaur-bearing rock formations

References

Further reading 
 

 
Geologic formations of China
Lower Cretaceous Series of Asia
Cretaceous China
Mudstone formations
Sandstone formations
Fluvial deposits
Lacustrine deposits
Paleontology in Liaoning
Formations